Acyphoderes longicollis is a species of beetle in the family Cerambycidae. It was described by Chemsak and Noguera in 1993.

References

Acyphoderes
Beetles described in 1993